Arthur Johnson Mellott (August 30, 1888 – December 29, 1957) was a United States district judge of the United States District Court for the District of Kansas.

Education and career

Born in Wallula, (an unincorporated community just south of Lansing), Kansas, Mellott received a Bachelor of Laws from the Kansas City School of Law (now the University of Missouri–Kansas City School of Law) in 1917. He was an Assistant United States Attorney for the District of Kansas from 1917 to 1918, and was in private practice in Kansas City, Kansas from 1919 to 1922. He was a Judge of the City Court of Kansas City from 1923 to 1924, and a county attorney in Kansas City from 1927 to 1929. From 1934 to 1935 he was a deputy commissioner of internal revenue in Washington, D.C. He was appointed to the United States Board of Tax Appeals in 1935, serving until 1942 when that body was converted to the United States Tax Court, serving as a Judge of that court until 1945.

Federal judicial service

Mellott was nominated by President Harry S. Truman on November 13, 1945, to the United States District Court for the District of Kansas, to a new seat authorized by 59 Stat. 545. He was confirmed by the United States Senate on November 27, 1945, and received his commission on November 29, 1945. He served as Chief Judge from 1948 to 1957. His service terminated on December 29, 1957, due to his death.

References

Sources
 

1888 births
1957 deaths
Kansas state court judges
University of Missouri–Kansas City alumni
Judges of the United States Tax Court
Judges of the United States District Court for the District of Kansas
United States district court judges appointed by Harry S. Truman
United States Article I federal judges appointed by Franklin D. Roosevelt
20th-century American judges
Assistant United States Attorneys
Members of the United States Board of Tax Appeals
People from Leavenworth County, Kansas